Hinkle–Garton Farmstead is a historic home and farm located at Bloomington, Monroe County, Indiana.  The farmhouse was built in 1892, and is a two-story, "T"-plan, Queen Anne style frame dwelling.  It has a cross-gable roof and rests on a stone foundation. Also on the property are the contributing -story gabled ell house (c. 1910), blacksmith shop (1901), garage (c. 1920, 932), a large barn (1928), and grain crib.

It was listed on the National Register of Historic Places in 2007.

References

Farms on the National Register of Historic Places in Indiana
Queen Anne architecture in Indiana
Houses completed in 1892
Buildings and structures in Bloomington, Indiana
National Register of Historic Places in Monroe County, Indiana